Dyschirius ambiguus is a species of ground beetle in the subfamily Scaritinae. It was described by Fedorenko in 1994.

References

ambiguus
Beetles described in 1994